Candy Spots (April 14, 1960 – March 21, 1976) was an American Thoroughbred racehorse.

Background
Candy Spots was foaled in California and was named for the unusual white and black markings, similar to Bend Or spots, that speckled his chestnut hair on his hind legs and rump. He was sired by the Argentine-bred stallion Nigromante, who was brought to California by Rex Ellsworth in 1957.

Racing career
Candy Spots was one of the best American juveniles of his generation, winning the Arlington-Washington Futurity Stakes among his 3 for 3 record at 2. Candy Spots was undefeated in starts going into the Kentucky Derby.

Candy Spots is best known for winning the 1963 Preakness Stakes and for coming in a close second and third, respectively, in the Belmont Stakes and Kentucky Derby to his rival Chateaugay.

His other wins in 1963 included the Jersey Derby, Florida Derby, Santa Anita Derby, American Derby and  Arlington Classic.

Unraced at 4, then later in his career in 1965, he won the San Pasqual Handicap.

Retirement 
Candy Spots was retired to stud in 1965, but he produced few stakes winners. His only offspring of note were 1973 Santa Susana Stakes winner Belle Marie, who was also the dam of 1982 American Champion Older Male Horse Lemhi Gold. Through his daughter Candy's Best, Candy Spots was also grandsire to Candy Éclair.

Candy Spots died in Lexington, Kentucky in March 1976 at the breeding shed of Warren B. Terry's Domino Stud of a ruptured renal artery. Candy Spots was the last direct male line descendant of Rock Sand to win an American Classic Race.[1]

Breeding

References

1960 racehorse births
1976 racehorse deaths
Racehorses bred in California
Racehorses trained in the United States
Preakness Stakes winners
Thoroughbred family 2-e